The Venetia Limpopo Nature Reserve is situated in the northernmost parts of South Africa, and is owned by the De Beers Diamond Mining Company - the mine itself is actually within the confines of the reserve.

The reserve is approximately 33,000 ha in size, and is characterised by the dominant mopane (Colophospermum mopane) veld-type. Whilst scenic, the area is very hot — summer temperatures regularly pass the 40 degrees Celsius mark.

The reserve is home to three of the big five (lion, elephant and leopard — but not rhino and buffalo). There was a population of African wild dog in the park which were part of a research project of the Carnivore Conservation Group, a branch of the Endangered Wildlife Trust.

Literally across the road is one of South Africa's newest national parks — the Mapungubwe National Park.

Nature reserves in South Africa
Protected areas of Limpopo